Turquoise Rose  is a 2007 independent drama film co-written and directed by Holt Hamilton that takes place on the Navajo Nation. Turquoise Rose was filmed primarily on the Navajo Nation in Fort Defiance, Arizona, as well as in Phoenix, Arizona. The film is one of the only American films to feature an indigenous Native American lead role for an actress, played by Navajo actress Johnson.

Synopsis
Turquoise "T" is in college in Phoenix and struggling at work as a photographer for a newspaper. She reluctantly agrees to stay with her grandmother on the Navajo reservation while she recovers from an illness. Over the summer she bonds deeply with her feisty and traditional grandmother in their rural homeland. Along the way she also gets to know the locals, including beginning a relationship with a handsome young artist named Harry, who's got personal issues of his own. Through many happy and sad memories, she gains a sense of purpose upon returning to the city and uses her skills in photography to make a change in her life, while honoring the experiences with her grandmother, with Harry by her side.

Cast
 Natasha Kaye Johnson as Turquoise "Rose" Roanhorse
 Deshava Apachee as Harry Bahe, Turquoise's love interest
 Ethel Begay as Masani, Turquoise's grandmother
 Rhonda Ray as Lillian Roamhorse, Turquoise's mother
 Bria Sherinian as Michelle, Turquoise's friend
 John Boomer as Sam Johnson
 Ernest "Ernie" David Tsosie III as Alvin Bahe
 Vincent Craig as Uncle Billy, Harry's uncle R.I.P Vincent Craig
 Katie Yazzie as Aunt Mary, Turquoise's aunt

Premiere
The film held its world premiere at Navajo History Museum & Visitor Center located at the Navajo Nation capital Window Rock, Arizona.

Accolades

See also
 Blue Gap Boy'z
 Pete & Cleo
 James and Ernie, a Navajo comedy duo

External links
 
 
 Turquoise Rose – 32nd American Indian Film Festival
 Director's 'Rose' is about to bloom at Gallup Independent
 Film set to imitate art and life on the rez at Gallup Independent
 Brainstorming in Baghdad…The Story Behind the Story of “Turquoise Rose” at NativeVue
 Turquoise Rose Premieres in Window Rock, Arizona at NativeVue
 Movie With All Navajo Cast To Debut at Native Youth Magazine
 Turquoise Rose at Tempe at Native Youth Magazine
 Turquoise Rose (2007) at Yahoo! movies
 Manta

2007 films
American independent films
Navajo-language films
Films about Native Americans
Films set in Fort Defiance, Arizona
Films set on the Navajo Nation
Films shot in Arizona
American drama films
2000s English-language films
2000s American films